Tomás Luciano Espinoza Estay (born 27 May 2001) is a Chilean footballer, currently playing as a midfielder for Colina.

Club career
Born in Quilpué, Chile, Espinoza started his career with Santiago Wanderers, joining at the age of nine, before a move to Argentina with Rosario Central at the age of thirteen. Due to intervention by FIFA, he was unable to play for a year. In October 2018, he was named by English newspaper The Guardian as one of the best players born in 2001 worldwide.

Shortly before his eighteenth birthday, he left Rosario Central in controversial circumstances to pursue a career in Brazil, with the Argentinian club claiming he "went on vacation and never came back". According to Espionza, he received threats from fans for the move. While in Brazil, he trained with a subsidiary of Grêmio named Soledade, eventually signing a two-year deal.

He returned to Chile in 2020, training with former club Rosario Central. However, after he was unable to secure a contract, he went on to train with Deportes La Serena in late 2020.

In 2022, he signed with Chilean Third Division side Colchagua. However, after fans and players clashed during a match against Rancagua Sur, both clubs were suspended from all competitions for eighteen months. Following his release from Colchagua, he worked as a labourer for his uncle, transporting jerky.

He returned to football in March 2023, playing in Deportes Colina's 3–0 Copa Chile win over Municipal Puente Alto.

International career
Espinoza has represented Chile at under-17 level.

Career statistics

Club

Notes

References

2001 births
Living people
People from Quilpué
Chilean footballers
Chile youth international footballers
Rosario Central footballers
Deportes Colchagua footballers
Deportes Colina footballers
Chilean expatriate footballers
Chilean expatriate sportspeople in Argentina
Expatriate footballers in Argentina
Chilean expatriate sportspeople in Brazil
Expatriate footballers in Brazil
Association football midfielders